Jason X is a 2001 American science fiction slasher film directed by Jim Isaac, written by Todd Farmer and starring Lexa Doig, Lisa Ryder, Chuck Campbell, and Kane Hodder in his fourth and final appearance as Jason Voorhees. It is the tenth installment in the Friday the 13th franchise following Jason Goes to Hell: The Final Friday (1993). In the film, Jason is cryogenically frozen for 445 years and awakens in 2455, after being found by a group of students, whom he subsequently stalks and kills one by one.

While other films of the franchise approach Jason as a human serial killer or undead monster, this movie views him through a science-fiction lens (referring to his inability to die as a "regenerative" power that can be studied and perhaps replicated) and then has him transformed by future-technology into a cyborg. This cyborg incarnation has been called Jason X in tie-in media, but is also often referred to by fans as "Uber Jason", a nickname the art design team and production crew used and which appeared in later comic books Jason X Special and Friday the 13th: Jason vs. Jason X. When conceiving the film, Todd Farmer came up with the idea of sending Jason into space, suggesting to the studio that it was the only direction left for the series. Kane Hodder called into the Howard Stern Show on May 1, 2002, and shared "I was a little hesitant about (the plot) the first time I heard the story too."

Jason X was theatrically released in the U.S. on April 26, 2002. It received mostly negative reviews from critics and was a box office bomb, grossing only $17 million on a budget of $11–14 million. The next film in the series, Freddy vs. Jason, was released in 2003; it is a crossover with the A Nightmare on Elm Street franchise, set between the events of The Final Friday and Jason X.

This would be Kane Hodder's final portrayal of Jason until he reprised the role in 2017 for Friday the 13th: The Game.

Plot
In 2008, mass murderer Jason Voorhees is captured by the United States government and held at the Crystal Lake Research Facility. After numerous failed attempts to kill Jason over the following two years, government scientist Rowan LaFontaine suggests putting him in cryogenic stasis. Dr. Wimmer and Sergeant Marcus arrive with soldiers, hoping to further research Jason's ability to heal from lethal wounds, as they believe it involves rapid cellular regeneration that can be replicated. Jason breaks free of his restraints and murders the soldiers and Dr. Wimmer. Rowan lures him into a cryogenic pod and activates it, but he ruptures the pod with his machete, stabbing her in the abdomen. Cryogenic fluid spills into the sealed room, freezing them both.

455 years later, Earth has become too polluted to support life and humans have moved to a new planet, Earth II. On a field trip to Earth, Professor Brandon Lowe, his android companion KM-14, intern Adrienne Thomas, and students Tsunaron, Janessa, Azrael, Kinsa, Waylander, and Stoney explore the abandoned Crystal Lake Research Facility, finding the frozen Jason and Rowan. They bring them aboard their spaceship, the Grendel, and revive Rowan while leaving Jason in the morgue, believing he is dead.

Adrienne is ordered to dissect Jason's body but Rowan warns them of the danger, revealing Jason's nature and superhuman abilities. Lowe, who is in serious debt, calls his financial backer Dieter Perez on the nearby space station Solaris. Perez recognizes Jason's name and notes his body could interest a collector. While Stoney and Kinsa have sex, Jason awakens and attacks Adrienne, freezing her face with liquid nitrogen before smashing her head to pieces on a counter. Jason takes a machete-shaped surgical tool and kills Stoney in front of Kinsa. Sergeant Brodski leads a group of soldiers to attack Jason. Jason interrupts a projected holographic game, breaking Azrael's back and bashing Dallas's skull in. He tries to attack Crutch, but Brodski and his soldiers arrive. After Brodski splits up his team, Jason kills them one by one.

Lowe orders pilot Lou to dock at Solaris. Jason kills Lou and the ship crashes through Solaris, destroying it and killing everyone aboard. Jason breaks into the lab, reclaims his machete and decapitates Lowe. With the Grendel crippled, the survivors head for a shuttle while Tsunaron upgrades KM-14. After crew member Crutch is electrocuted by Jason, Kinsa panics and attempts to escape on her own, but forgets to release the shuttle's fuel line, causing it to crash into the ship and explode. Tsunaron reappears with an upgraded KM-14 who wields weapons and combat skills to stand a better chance against Jason. After having his right arm, left leg, right ribs, and part of his head blasted off by KM-14, his body is knocked into a nanite-equipped medical station. The survivors send a distress call, then set explosive charges to separate the ship's undamaged pontoon from the main section.

The medical station nanites rebuild Jason, who becomes a cyborg. With his new strength, Jason easily defeats KM-14 by punching her head off. As Tsunaron recovers her still-functioning head, Jason is stopped by Waylander, who sacrifices himself by setting off the charges while the others escape. Jason survives and punches a hole through the hull, causing Janessa to die in the vacuum. A power failure with the docking door forces Brodski to go outside in an EVA suit to fix it.

To distract Jason, a holographic simulation of Camp Crystal Lake is created with two virtual teenage girls. After killing them, Jason realizes the deception just as the door is fixed. Still in his EVA suit, Brodski confronts Jason so the rest can escape. As they leave, the pontoon explodes, propelling Jason at high speed towards the survivors; Brodski intercepts Jason's space flight and maneuvers them both toward Earth II's atmosphere, where they are both incinerated on atmospheric entry. Tsunaron, Rowan, and KM-14 escape as Tsunaron assures KM-14 she will have a new body.

On Earth II, a pair of teenagers are by a lake when they see what they believe is a falling star. The teenagers go to investigate as Jason's charred mask sinks to the bottom of the lake.

Cast

 Kane Hodder as Jason Voorhees / Uber Jason
 Lexa Doig as Rowan LaFontaine
 Lisa Ryder as Kay-Em 14
 Chuck Campbell as Tsunaron Peyton
 Melyssa Ade as Janessa Zachary
 Peter Mensah as Sergeant Elijah Brodski
 Melody Johnson as Kirra "Kinsa" Cooper
 Derwin Jordan as Waylander
 Jonathan Potts as Professor Brandon Lowe
 Phillip Williams as Trevor Crutchfield "Crutch"
 Dov Tiefenbach as Azrael Benrubi
 Kristi Angus as Adrienne Thomas
 Dylan Bierk as Private Briggs
 Amanda Brugel as Private Geko
 Yani Gellman as Stoney
 Todd Farmer as Private Dallas
 Thomas Seniuk as Private Sven
 Steve Lucescu as Private Condor
 David Cronenberg as Dr. Aloysius Wimmer
 Robert A. Silverman as Dieter Perez
 Marcus Parilo as Sgt. Marcus
 Boyd Banks as Louis "Fat Lou" Goddard
 Jeff Geddis as Soldier #1 (Private Samuel Johnson)

Production
Development of Jason X began in the late 1990s while Freddy vs. Jason was still in development hell. With Freddy vs. Jason not moving forward, Jim Isaac and Sean S. Cunningham decided that they wanted another Friday the 13th film made to retain audience interest in the character. The film was conceived by Todd Farmer, who plays "Dallas" in the film, and was the only pitch he gave to the studio for the movie, having suggested sending Jason into space as a means to advance the film series.

The movie was filmed March 6, 2000 through May 2000 in Toronto. The film score was composed and performed by Harry Manfredini. It was released by Varèse Sarabande on May 14, 2002.

Release

Theatrical
Jason X premiered in November 2001 in Spain, and was released on April 26, 2002, in the United States. A theatrical trailer was released on November 9, 2001.

Home media
The film was released on VHS and DVD on October 8, 2002. It was released on Blu-ray in 2013, with all of the films in the Friday the 13th: The Complete Collection set.

Reception

Box office
The film made $13.1 million in the U.S. and $3.8 million internationally for a worldwide gross of $16.9 million, becoming one of the worst-performing films in the series, after Jason Takes Manhattan and Jason Goes to Hell, which made $14.3 million and $15.9 million, respectively.

Critical response
On review aggregator website Rotten Tomatoes Jason X has an approval rating of 19% based on 108 reviews, and an average rating of 3.8/10. The site's critical consensus reads: "Jason goes to the future, but the story is still stuck in the past." On Metacritic the film has a weighted average score of 25 out of 100, based on 23 critics, indicating "generally unfavorable reviews". Audiences polled by CinemaScore gave the film an average grade of "C" on an A+ to F scale.

Roger Ebert gave the film 0.5 stars out of 4, quoting one of the film's lines: "This sucks on so many levels."

However, the film was better received in the United Kingdom, gaining positive reviews from the country's two major film magazines, Total Film and Empire. Empires review by Kim Newman in particular praised Jason X as "Wittily scripted, smartly directed and well-played by an unfamiliar cast, this is a real treat for all those who have suffered through the story so far."

Despite the initially negative reception from critics, the film has recently seen a retrospective growth in popularity, particularly among younger fans of the series. Praise has been directed at the film's ability to poke fun at itself and the film series as a whole, as well as inventive death scenes; Adrienne's death in particular (head frozen in liquid nitrogen, and then shattered against a table) is often singled out as a highlight, and was even tested on an episode of MythBusters in 2009.

Other media

Comic books
In 2005, Avatar Press published the comic book Jason X Special as a direct sequel to the movie, written by Brian Pulido, with art by Sebastian Fumara and coloring by Mark Sweeney. The comic reveals that a scientist named Kristen intercepted the Grendel's communications and became interested in learning the secrets of Jason's regenerative abilities so she could save her lover Neil as well as the human race, which is still an endangered species barely surviving. To trick the Grendel survivors into bringing Jason to her, she faked the rescue transmission and hacked into their system, using their own holographic technology to convince them they were escaping to Earth II. This resulted in the deaths of all aboard the Grendel. Aboard her own ship, Kristen then attempts to study Jason X, referring to him as "Uber-Jason." Jason X's new cyborg abilities allow him to take control of Kristen's technology. When she attempts to pass on his regenerative abilities to Neil, the nanites in Jason X's blood corrupt's the man's mind and he stabs her. Kristen's ship then comes across a hedonistic pleasure spaceship called Fun Club. After docking, Jason boards the Fun Club and begins killing the hedonists, ending the story.

In 2006, Avatar Press released a licensed two-issue comic book mini-series called Friday the 13th: Jason vs. Jason X, written and illustrated by Mike Wolfer, with Andrew Dalhouse as colorist. Advertised as a fight between Jason and "Uber-Jason," the mini-series is a continuation of the comic Jason X Special. While Jason X is aboard the Fun Club, the story returns to the Grendel drifting in space where a malfunctioning medical station attempts to revive the half of Jason's head that KM-14 shot off in the movie. Since the nanites cannot revive only "13%" of Jason's body mass into a full living being, it collects the remains of other dead bodies aboard the ship and uses them as raw material. As a result, another version of Jason is resurrected, one who resembles the traditional version. When scavengers board the Grendel, the traditional Jason attacks and then uses their shuttle to reach the nearest ship, the Fun Club pleasure cruiser. There, the revived Jason finds the cyborg Jason X and the two fight while also killing all passengers they come across. Each killer is revealed to have only part of the mind and memory of the original Jason. The battle ends when Jason X defeats and rips out the brain matter of the traditional Jason, merging it with his own and restoring his full memories and personality. The ship crashes on Earth II and Jason X leaves the wreckage to explore a nearby forest.

Video games
After the 2017 release of Friday the 13th: The Game, it was teased that the cyborg Jason X incarnation would be playable in the game the following year. However, Victor Miller, screenwriter of the original film Friday the 13th, exercised his legal creative rights and served a lawsuit regarding residual profits he felt he was owed by the film franchise and tie-in media that resulted from the original movie. As a result, the game halted the release of new characters and features. Although a partial version of Jason X already existed in the game's files and could be activated with a hack, the fully playable version of Jason X was never released for the game.

See also
List of films featuring space stations
List of science-fiction films of the 2000s

References

External links

 
  
 
 
 
 
 Film page at the Camp Crystal Lake web site
 Film page at Fridaythe13thfilms.com

2001 films
2001 horror films
2000s science fiction horror films
2000s slasher films
American science fiction horror films
American sequel films
American slasher films
Android (robot) films
Cryonics in fiction
Cyborg films
Films directed by James Isaac
Films scored by Harry Manfredini
Films shot in Toronto
Films set in 2008
Films set in 2010
Films set in the 25th century
Films set in the future
Films set on fictional planets
Films set on spacecraft
10
Military science fiction films
New Line Cinema films
Films with screenplays by Todd Farmer
2000s English-language films
2000s American films